The Hall of Honor is a memorial at the National Security Agency headquarters in Fort Meade, Maryland. It honors individuals who rendered distinguished service to American cryptology.

The Hall of Honor
The Hall of Honor is located on the grounds of the National Cryptologic Museum adjacent to NSA's headquarters in Ft. Meade, MD. Created in 1999, The standards are high for induction into the Hall of Honor. The individuals honored were innovators over their entire peers or made major contributions to the structure and processes of American cryptology.

Inductees
Yearly, the National Cryptologic Museum Foundation recommends a slate of honorees to the National Security Agency for consideration along with nominees from other sources.

2021
 Joseph E. Gilligan, Jr.
 Jack C. Mortick
 Clifford Cocks, James H. Ellis, and Malcolm J. Williamson

2020
 George Cotter
 Whitfield Diffie
 David Kahn (writer)
 Barbara McNamara
 Lester Myers

2019
 Edward M. Drake
 Chief Radioman Harry Kidder, USN
 Colonel Alva Bryan Lasswell, USMC
 Lieutenant General Kenneth A. Minihan, USAF

2018
 Richard L. "Dick" Bernard
 Seymour R. Cray
 Michael J. Jacobs
 Hilda Faust Mathieu
 Whitney E. Reed

2017
 Mary H. "Polly" Budenbach
 Dennis M. Chiari
 Colonel Frank E. Herrelko, USAF
 Admiral Bobby Inman, USN
 Floyd L. Weakley

2016
 Gerald Hale
 Captain Leonard T. Jones, USCG
 Command Sergeant Major Odell Williams, USA

2015
 Ralph W. Adams, Jr.
 Charles R. Lord
 William O. Marks
 Robert J. McNelis
 Virginia Jenkins Riley

2014
 Frank C. Austin
 Walter Deeley
 Howard Ehret
 Marian Rejewski
 Alan Turing

2013
 Vera Ruth Filby
 Richard Proto
 Washington Wong
 Native American Code talkers

2012
 Ann Caracristi
 Robert E. Drake
 Ronald Hunt
 Juliana Mickwitz

2011
 William D. Coffee
 Joseph Desch
 Colonel Parker Hitt
 Laura Holmes

2010
 Joseph Amato
 David Boak
 Genevieve Grotjan Feinstein
 Leo Rosen

2009
 Richard A. Day Jr.
 Minnie M. Kenny
  Major general Doyle E. Larson
 Arthur Levenson

2008
 Benson K. Buffman
 Charles L. Gandy
 General Alfred M. Gray
 Oliver R. Kirby
 Rear Admiral Donald M. Showers

2007
 Jacob "Jack" Gurin
 Robert J. Hermann
 Samuel Simon Snyder
 Milton Zaslow

2006
 Brigadier General Bernard Ardisana
 Edward A. Everett
 Cecil J. Phillips
 James W. Pryde
 Thomas E. Tremain

2005
 William Blankinship
 Francis Raven
 Arthur J. Salemme
 Rear Admiral Joseph N. Wenger

2004
 Dorothy T. Blum
 James R. Chiles
 Meredith Gardner
 Brigadier General John Tiltman

2003
 Lambros D. Callimahos
 Lowell K. Frazer
 Juanita Moody
 Howard E. Rosenblum

2002
 Captain Thomas H. Dyer
 Norman Wild
 Richard A. Leibler
 Mitford M. Mathews
 Charles C. Tevis
 Julia Ward

2001
 Howard C. Barlow
 Mahlon E. Doyle
 Sydney Jaffe
 Major General John E. Morrison

2000
 Louis W. Tordella
 Captain Joseph Rochefort
 Agnes Meyer Driscoll

1999
 William F. Friedman
 Elizebeth Friedman
 Herbert Yardley
 Captain Laurance Safford
 Frank Rowlett
 Abraham Sinkov
 Solomon Kullback
 Lieutenant General Ralph Canine

References

See also
 National Security Agency/Central Security Service Cryptologic Memorial
 CIA Memorial Wall
 Military Intelligence Hall of Fame
 National Security Agency
 National Cryptologic Museum

National Security Agency
Monuments and memorials in Maryland
Science and technology halls of fame
Halls of fame in Maryland
Awards established in 1999